B. M. Rahul Bharadwaj (born 18 April 2000) is an Indian badminton player. Trained at the Prakash Padukone Badminton Academy, he was the boys' singles U–15 National Champions in 2014, and won his first international title at the 2019 Uganda International tournament. He later won the 2019 Kenya and Croatian International tournaments.

Achievements

BWF International Challenge/Series (3 titles) 
Men's singles

  BWF International Challenge tournament
  BWF International Series tournament
  BWF Future Series tournament

BWF Junior International (2 runners-up) 
Boys' singles

  BWF Junior International Grand Prix tournament
  BWF Junior International Challenge tournament
  BWF Junior International Series tournament
  BWF Junior Future Series tournament

References

External links 

Living people
2000 births
Racket sportspeople from Bangalore
Indian male badminton players